Countries belonging to the Commonwealth of Nations typically exchange High Commissioners rather than Ambassadors. Though there are a few technical differences, they are in practice the same office. The following persons have served as British High Commissioner to the Islamic Republic of Pakistan.

The state of Pakistan was established on 14 August 1947 in the eastern and northwestern regions of British India.
In 1972, Pakistan temporarily withdrew from the Commonwealth, and until it rejoined in 1989, the mission in Islamabad became an Embassy, headed by an Ambassador. The High Commissioner is based at the British High Commission in Islamabad.

List of heads of mission

High Commissioners to Pakistan

1947–1951: Sir Laurence Grafftey-Smith
1951–1954: Sir Gilbert Laithwaite
1954–1961: Sir Alexander Symon
1961–1965: Sir Morrice James
1966–1971: Sir Cyril Pickard

Ambassadors to Pakistan

1972–1976: Sir Laurence Pumphrey
1976–1979: John Bushell
1979–1984: Sir Oliver Forster
1984–1987: Richard Fyjis-Walker
1987–1989: Nicholas Barrington

High Commissioners to Pakistan

1989–1994: Sir Nicholas Barrington
1994–1997: Sir Christopher MacRae
1997–2000: Sir David Dain
2000–2003: Sir Hilary Synnott
2003–2006: Sir Mark Lyall Grant
2006–2010: Robert Brinkley
2010–2013: Sir Adam Thomson
2014–2016: Philip Barton
2016-2019: Thomas Drew

2019–2022: Christian Turner
2022– present: Andrew Dalgleish (acting)

References

External links

UK and Pakistan, gov.uk

Pakistan
 
United Kingdom High Commissioners
Pakistan and the Commonwealth of Nations
United Kingdom and the Commonwealth of Nations